Tazareh (also Romanized as  Ţazareh and Ţazereh; also known as Tajar and Ţarzeh) is a village in Damankuh Rural District, in the Central District of Damghan County, Semnan Province, Iran. At the 2006 census, its population was 214, in 52 families.

References 

Populated places in Damghan County